Bob Bryan and Mike Bryan were the defending champions, but lost in the semifinals this year.

Rick Leach and Brian MacPhie won in the final 6–3, 6–4, against Jonathan Erlich and Andy Ram.

Seeds

Draw

Draw

External links
Draw

Los Angeles Open (tennis)
2005 ATP Tour